Eyshabad or Eishabad or Aishabad or Ayshabad may refer to:
 Eyshabad, East Azerbaijan
 Eyshabad, Isfahan
 Eyshabad, Rafsanjan, Kerman Province, Iran
 Eyshabad, Balvard, Sirjan County, Kerman Province, Iran
 Eyshabad, Chenaran, Razavi Khorasan Province, Iran
 Eyshabad, Nishapur, Razavi Khorasan Province, Iran
 Eyshabad-e Nizeh, Razavi Khorasan Province, Iran
 Eyshabad, Yazd